Threadgold is an occupational surname of English origin. Notable people with the surname include:

Gabe Threadgold (born 2000), American soccer player
Harry Threadgold (1924 - 1996), English footballer
Mark Threadgold (born 1977), Australian painter
William Threadgold (1885 - 1946), Australian politician

Occupational surnames
English-language surnames
English-language occupational surnames